Hamish and Dougal are two characters from the long-running BBC Radio 4 radio comedy panel game I'm Sorry I Haven't a Clue, played by Barry Cryer and Graeme Garden, who later went on to have their own Radio 4 series, You'll Have Had Your Tea: The Doings of Hamish and Dougal. The series is occasionally broadcast on the BBC's repeat station, Radio 4 Extra.

History
The fictional characters Hamish and Dougal originated in one of the rounds of I'm Sorry I Haven't a Clue called Sound Charades.  In this round the title of a book or film has to be conveyed from one team to the other by means of a story; the result of the story is usually a pun on the title in question. The panellists Cryer and Garden often tell their story as Hamish and Dougal, who are two elderly Scottish gentlemen.  One of the characters was originally called Angus. The duo continued with the characters, according to Garden "mainly because (fellow panellist) Tim Brooke-Taylor hated them".  A prototype Hamish and Dougal first appeared in a 1979 Christmas Special of 'Clue', doing 'Wee Freak Ings Of Orient Are', with John Junkin standing in for Barry Cryer. However, the characters didn't appear fully formed until the 1995 Christmas Special, when the duo gave the clue for 'The Queen's Peach'. Hamish and Dougal then became the focus of a spin-off show called You'll Have Had Your Tea: The Doings of Hamish and Dougal, abbreviated to Hamish and Dougal on the packaging of the official CD releases. 

The spin-off show was named in reference to the fact that the characters' sketches on I'm Sorry I Haven't a Clue began with a variant of the line "You'll have had your tea then, Hamish".  This refers to an idiom used in Edinburgh, where a visitor who has dropped in at "tea" (a colloquial term for an evening meal) is informed that the host does not intend to feed them. The stereotype of Scottish people being careful with their money is regularly played on in the series.

Episodes were 15 minutes long and were extensions of the one-minute sketches. The series featured two other actors:  regular I'm Sorry I Haven't a Clue panelist Jeremy Hardy, and Alison Steadman. Steadman played Mrs Naughtie the housekeeper, while Hardy played the local laird. The announcer was BBC newsreader Brian Perkins. The music for the series was arranged by Graeme's son Jon Garden and performed by a four-piece ceilidh band. The programmes were produced by Jon Naismith.  Other actors have also featured in guest appearances, such as the 2004 Hogmanay special which featured guest appearances from I'm Sorry I Haven't a Clue chairman Humphrey Lyttelton, as the Laird's butler Lyttelton, Today programme presenter Jim Naughtie (as Mrs Naughtie's long-lost son), Sandi Toksvig (as Sandi Wedge, a very tall golf champion) and Tim Brooke-Taylor and Colin Sell (as themselves).

The show relied heavily on sexual innuendo, and Scottish stereotypes. Long-running jokes from the parent series were frequently referred to, such as the quality of Hardy's singing voice, which is occasionally excruciatingly demonstrated in the series, it is thought that Hardy's character The Laird's favorite band is Atomic Kitten having sung Eternal Flame In Series 1 Episode 1 - The Musical Evening and The Tide is High in Series 1 Episode 4 - The Shooting Party.  

Fictitious place-names used within the series include Ben Kingsley, Loch Krankie, and Glen Close.

A book of the complete scripts from all three series plus the Hogmanay and Burns Night specials was published in hardback by Preface Publishing on 28 August 2008 entitled The Doings of Hamish and Dougal: You'll Have Had Your Tea?. The book also includes comedy cooking recipes created by Garden and poems.

Critical reception
The series has been described as "reality-based comedy at its finest" by The Times, and as "basically The Beano with added smut" by The Independent. Gavin Docherty of the Daily Express said, after reading the book of scripts, "I laughed so hard my head nearly fell off".

The Scotsman gave the series a negative review, with Robert McNeil describing the series as one in which "two clapped-out has-beens (except they never-weres) put on ridiculous Scottish voices and enact quasi-racist routines". Cryer has denied that the show is anti-Scottish saying the series was "an affectionate laugh at all things Scottish. Graeme is half Scottish. I am borderline, having been born in Cumbria." Garden stated that in the series they were sending up the stereotypes of Scots rather than Scots themselves (which makes it all right).

Episode list

References

Further reading 

 

Comedy radio characters
I'm Sorry I Haven't a Clue
BBC Radio comedy programmes
2002 radio programme debuts
Ethnic humour
Radio duos
Fictional Scottish people
Male characters in radio
2002 establishments in the United Kingdom